Opal is a (usually) feminine given name derived from the name of the gemstone opal. The gemstone is the birthstone for October. Its name is derived from the Sanskrit , which means 'jewel'. It came into use along with other gemstone names during the late Victorian era.  The iridescent, many-colored gem was called the “queen of gems” in Ancient Rome.  The name has recently increased in usage, a trend that has been attributed to a renewed interest in “cottagecore names” with a vintage sensibility that are rooted in the natural world.  Author Laura Wattenberg calls the sound of the name unique.

Opal was among the 100 most popular names for girls born in the United States from 1900 to 1920 and remained among the top 500 most popular names for girls there until 1950. It declined in popularity but has again increased in usage. It has been among the 1,000 most popular names for American girls since 2017. It was the 344th most common name for females in the United States in the 1990 census.

People
Opal Palmer Adisa (born 1954), Jamaica-born award-winning poet, novelist, performance artist and educator.
Opal Wilcox Barron (1914-2010), First Lady of West Virginia from 1961 to 1965
Opal Carew, pen name of Canadian erotic romance novelist Elizabeth Batten-Carew
Opal Hill (1892-1981), American professional golfer
Opal Kunz (1894-1969), American aviator
Opal Lee (born 1926), American retired teacher, counselor, and activist in the movement to make Juneteenth a federally-recognized holiday in the United States
Opal J. Moore (born 1953),  African-American poet, short-story author, and professor
Sara Opal Search (1890-1961), American composer
Opal Sofer (born 1997), Israeli professional footballer
Opal Whiteley (1897-1992), American nature writer and diarist

Notes

English feminine given names
Given names derived from gemstones